The High School of Graphic Communication Arts (H.S.G.C.A.) is a vocational high school located in the Hell's Kitchen section of Manhattan in New York City.  Founded in 1925 as the New York School of Printing, the school is divided into five academies that offer basic instruction in several fields including  printing, photography, journalism, visual arts, and law enforcement.

History
The building that now houses the school was built in 1959 by the architectural firm of Kelly & Gruzen (now known as Gruzen Samton Architects) and is one of the best known structures designed utilizing a vigorous display of the international architectural style movement in the city. It was also the first high school in the city to have escalators. The school is home to a mural, located at its main entrance, that was designed by Hans Hofmann, one of the leading artists of the Abstract Expressionist movement. The building is located on West 49th Street between 9th and 10th Avenues.

The school was the original home of Metropolitan Playhouse, resident until 1995, and has since leased some of its space to the Manhattan Playhouse to serve as a community theater that showcases many local off-Broadway productions.

In October 2010, it was announced that the school was on the New York City Department of Education's shortlist of schools targeted for closing. It was one of two schools in Manhattan on the list, and the only high school in the borough scheduled to be closed due to poor academic performance. On 26 April 2012, the city's Board of Education voted to close the school after the then-current class graduated in June 2012. On May 11, 2012, the city's education department announced that the school would be reopened in the fall 2012 as the Creative Digital Minds High School. However, on June 29, 2012, a ruling by a legal arbitrator announced that all 24 schools slated to close under the city's "Turn Around" program (which included Graphics) would remain open. The ruling halted a central element of Mayor Michael Bloomberg's plans for closing and reopening the affected schools, saying its method for overhauling the staff at those institutions violated existing labor contracts.

The Success Academy Charter Schools group planned to open an elementary school in the same building as the high school in 2013. The location was suggested by the city's education department. In addition, Success Academy Charter School – Manhattan Middle School was planned to open for school year 2015–2016 to educate the middle school grades of several other Success Academies.

Notable alumni 
 Carolyn Butts – journalist, literary agent, film producer, and founding publisher of African Voices literary magazine
 Dan Dorfman – financial journalist
 David Horowitz – consumer advocate
 Wilbert Mora – New York City Police Officer who was shot on January 21, 2022, while responding to a domestic violence call in Harlem. He later succumbed to his injuries on January 25, 2022.

References

External links 
 
 School Improvement Scenario website

Public high schools in Manhattan
Educational institutions established in 1925
School buildings completed in 1959
Modernist architecture in New York City
International style architecture in New York City
Hell's Kitchen, Manhattan
1925 establishments in New York City